The Air Force District of Washington (AFDW) is a Direct Reporting Unit of the United States Air Force. AFDW oversees Air Force operations in the Washington, D.C. region (also known as the "National Capital Region" or "NCR").

As a Direct Reporting Unit, AFDW is directly subordinate to the Chief of Staff, Headquarters, United States Air Force, and serves as the Air Force service component to the JFHQ-NCR. AFDW was originally headquartered on Bolling Air Force Base, but changed to Joint Base Andrews-Naval Air Facility Washington (JBA-NAFW).

History
AFDW originates back to the post-World War II era when Bolling Field Command was established on 15 December 1946. Bolling Field Command absorbed functions from various support organizations in the Washington, D.C. vicinity. It was redesignated Headquarters Command, USAF, on 17 March 1958. When Headquarters Command, USAF, inactivated on 1 July 1976, many of its functions passed to Military Airlift Command. The Air Force District of Washington was constituted and activated, on 1 October 1985. it was inactivated on 15 Jul 1994, due to declining defense budgets. AFDW was reactivated on 7 July 2005, to realign the Air Force command structure in the NCR with the other military services, improve Air Force support to Joint Force Headquarters – National Capital Region (JFHQ-NCR).

Mission
AFDW oversees two wings and one group on JBA-NAFW: the 11th Wing, the 79th Medical Wing and the 844th Communication Group. The 79th Medical Wing and 844th Communications Group both have specialized missions and serve as a single Air Force voice in the National Capital Region (NCR) for their respective fields of expertise. The 11th Wing fulfills duties as the host base organization of JBA-NAFW, while also supporting AFDW requirements. AFDW also supports airmen in more than 2,000 Air Force Elements in more than 500 locations in 108 countries.

AFDW serves as the Air Force service component for coordination purposes to JFHQ-NCR and the supporting command to Joint Task Force-National Capital Region/Medical (JTF-CapMed). JFHQ-NCR has an emergency or major event operation 'mobilization' function as Joint Task Force-National Capital Region. When the JFHQ-NCR transitions to the Joint Task Force NCR (JTF-NCR), the 320th Air Expeditionary Wing (320 AEW) activates and becomes the Air Force service component of JTF-NCR. Normally, the Commander of AFDW serves as the Commander, 320 AEW. Air Force Mission Directive 13 delineates missions and assigned duties applicable to AFDW in both its worldwide Air Force service role and its JTF-NCR Air Force service component role.

Component units
Air Force District of Washington comprises the following wings and major units.

Headquarters 

 Headquarters Air Force District of Washington (Joint Base Andrews, Maryland)

Permanent units 

 11th Wing (Joint Base Anacostia–Bolling, Washington, D.C.)
 US Air Force Band
 US Air Force Chaplaincy (Arlington National Cemetery)
 US Air Force Honor Guard
 316th Wing (Joint Base Andrews) – UH-1N Iroquois
 844th Communications Group (Joint Base Andrews)

Expeditionary units 

 320th Air Expeditionary Wing (Joint Base Anacostia–Bolling)

List of commanders

See also
 United States Army Military District of Washington
 Naval District Washington

References

Attribution:

External links

 Official AFDW website

Direct reporting units of the United States Air Force
Military in Washington, D.C.
Military units and formations in Maryland
Military units and formations established in 1985
1985 establishments in the United States